The Dürrenstein is a mountain in the Dolomites in South Tyrol, Italy.

References 
Alpenverein South Tyrol

External links 

Mountains of the Alps
Mountains of South Tyrol
Dolomites